Call Me Out may refer to:

"Call Me Out", song by Ra Ra Riot from Need Your Light 2016
"Call Me Out", song by Gareth Asher and the Earthlings
"Call Me Out", song by Shook Twins
"Call Me Out", song by Sarah Close 2017